Shuisheliao is a railway station on the Forestry Bureau Alishan Forest Railway line located in Zhuqi Township, Chiayi County, Taiwan.

History
The station was opened on 1 October 1910. In the 1990s the station became unattended.

Architecture
The station is located at an elevation of 1,186 meters above sea level.

See also
 List of railway stations in Taiwan

References

1910 establishments in Taiwan
Alishan Forest Railway stations
Railway stations in Chiayi County
Railway stations opened in 1910